State Route 381 (SR 381) is a primary state highway in the US state of Virginia. Known as Commonwealth Avenue, the state highway runs  from the Tennessee state line north to the  Interstate 381 (I-381) within the independent city of Bristol. In conjunction with I-381, SR 381 connects I-81 with downtown Bristol. The state highway also connects the Interstate Highways with US Route 11 (US 11), US 11W, US 11E, US 19, and US 421; SR 381 runs concurrently with the latter three highways between downtown Bristol and US 11. I-381 is a spur from I-81 that provides access to Bristol. The I-81 interchange, the only one on I-381, is signed as exit 1A (I-81 north) and exit 1B (I-81 south).

Route description

SR 381 begins at the Tennessee state line at State Street, which follows the Virginia–Tennessee state line as the main street of Bristol, Virginia, to the north and Bristol, Tennessee, to the south and forms the easternmost part of Tennessee State Route 1 west of the intersection. The roadway continues south as US 11E and US 19 following Volunteer Parkway, a major arterial through Bristol, Tennessee, that leads toward Johnson City. SR 381 and the two US Routes head north along Commonwealth Avenue, a four-lane divided highway that intersects Goode Street one block north of the state line; Goode Street carries US 421 and both US 11 Truck and US 19 Truck through the Bristol Commercial Historic District. SR 381, US 11E, US 19, and US 421 meet the southern end of SR 113 at separate intersections: Cumberland Street carries northbound SR 113 east and Sycamore Street carries the westbound direction. The four highways continue north to east–west Euclid Avenue, where US 11E has its northern terminus. Westbound Euclid Avenue heads west carrying northbound US 421 and southbound US 11W toward Kingsport and Gate City. US 19 turns east to join US 11 on eastbound Euclid Avenue. SR 381 continues north along Commonwealth Avenue, paralleling a railroad line through an industrial area to its northern terminus at an intersection with Keys Street.

The roadway continues north as I-381, which connects downtown Bristol with I-81, the route to Roanoke and Knoxville. The I-81 interchange, the only one on I-381, is signed as exit 1A (I-81 north) and exit 1B (I-81 south).

History

The I-381 freeway originally opened to traffic on November 20, 1961, the same time as the part of I-81 that bypasses Bristol to the north.

In its original configuration, the interchange between I-81 and I-381 was a single Y interchange, providing access from southbound I-81 to southbound I-381 (via a left exit) and northbound I-381 to northbound I-81. By 1989, ramps were added to make it a full directional T interchange. In 1996, southbound I-81 was moved next to the northbound side, turning the southbound left exit and entrance into right-side ramps.

Junction list

References

External links

81-3 (Virginia)
81-3
Interstate 81-3
3
381
State Route 381